The Flash is a 1993 action video game based on The Flash TV series on CBS. It was developed and manufactured by Sega and Probe Entertainment for the Master System.

Gameplay
The game is played from the typical platform style of the scrolling side on, 2D, 3rd person viewpoint. The player controls Flash though the levels in which they must achieve 2 primary goals. 
A) Find the switch which opens the level exit and then: 
B) make it to the exit within the time limit. 
There is also a secondary goal of collecting the gems that were stolen which increases the players score. 
If the player fails to make it to the exit within the time limit the FED tracks Flash down and kills him upon contact. While the player can run from the FED (giving them a last gasp effort to make it to the end of the level) due to the FED's ability to move over the screen regardless of the physical restraints that the player must encounter (e.g. walls) the player is eventually doomed to losing a life.

The FED acts as a more realistic method for imposing a time limit rather than the player just suddenly dying like in many platform games of this era.

The levels in the game are given the title "Episode." Each Episode is split into two zones. At the beginning of zone 1, Tina from S.T.A.R. Labs will report to Flash on the whereabouts and activities of the Trickster giving the player an intro to the Episode and to help advance the storyline. At the end of the second zone in each Episode, Flash must face Trickster in his Trickstermobile. While the boss in the "boss stage" remains the same throughout the game, the Trickstermobile increases in difficulty with additional weapons and speed as the game progresses.

Unrelated Game Boy version
A different Flash game was released for Game Boy in 1991 by THQ. The Game Boy version was also based on The Flash TV series, and had a password system.  Unlike the Master System release, it was released in the United States.

Reception

Critical reception to The Flash was mixed. Some found the fast pace of the game too difficult to control while others appreciated the depth in graphics, level design, and the soundtrack. However, by 1993, the Sega Master System was no longer supported in the Japanese and United States markets. Thus, the game's existence in the world's two biggest video game countries went relatively unnoticed and remains an obscure European release to this day. However, it is highly valued by some retro game collectors for this very reason.

References

External links

Master System games
1991 video games
1993 video games
Action video games
Game Boy games
Video games based on DC Comics
Video games scored by Jeroen Tel
Video games developed in the United Kingdom
Superhero video games
Flash (comics) in other media
Video games set in the United States